Kol HaAm (lit. "Voice of the People") was a Hebrew-language newspaper in Mandatory Palestine and Israel. It was initially published by the Palestine Communist Party and later by its successor, the Israeli Communist Party.

History
Established in 1937, the paper appointed Communist Party member Esther Vilenska editor in 1943, and chief editor in 1947. Vilenska's second husband, Zvi Breidstein, was also an editor of the paper.

In 1953 Kol HaAm and its Arabic-language sister newspaper Al-Ittihad published a controversial article on the Korean War, which resulted in the Minister of Internal Affairs Israel Rokach, ordering the paper to close for 15 days. The papers filed a petition to the Supreme Court, which ruled that the suspension had been wrongly issued and should be set aside. The ruling utilised the Declaration of Independence in making its judgement on the issue of free speech, the first time the declaration was used as an instrument for interpretation. In doing so, the court reversed the holding in High Court Judgement 10/48 Zeev v. Gubernik that the objective of the Declaration of Independence was solely to declare the establishment of the state of Israel. In 1992, the principles of the Declaration of Independence were formally incorporated into Basic Law: Human Dignity and Liberty, granting the declaration formal constitutional status.

What became known as the "Kol HaAm Decision" also set the precedent that newspapers could only be shut down if there was a "almost certain" danger to national security.

The newspaper ceased publication in 1975.

Writers
Writers for the paper included:
Israel Panner

References

External links
Online, searchable Kol HaAm editions from the Historical Jewish Press

1937 establishments in Mandatory Palestine
1975 disestablishments in Israel
Newspapers established in 1937
Publications disestablished in 1975
Hebrew-language newspapers
Communist newspapers published in Israel
Defunct newspapers published in Israel